Happy Memories is a Canadian drama film, directed by Francis Mankiewicz and released in 1981. Identified by film critics as a spiritual if not literal sequel to his previous film Good Riddance (Les Bons débarras), the film stars Julie Vincent as Viviane, a young woman returning home for the first time since running away several years earlier.

The film also stars Monique Spaziani as Viviane's sister Marie, who has an incestuous relationship with their father (Paul Hébert); Andrée Lachapelle as their mother, who also abandoned the family years earlier; and Rémy Girard as their mother's new partner.

The film received three Genie Award nominations at the 3rd Genie Awards: Best Actress (Spaziani), Best Screenplay (Réjean Ducharme) and Best Original Score (Jean Cousineau).

References

External links
 

1981 films
Canadian drama films
Films directed by Francis Mankiewicz
1981 drama films
1980s French-language films
French-language Canadian films
1980s Canadian films